Ceratopteris thalictroides is a fern species belonging to the genus Ceratopteris, one of only two genera of the subfamily Parkerioideae of the family Pteridaceae.

Common names

Ceratopteris thalictroides is commonly known as water sprite, Indian fern, water fern, oriental waterfern, and water hornfern. In the Philippines, it is called pakung-sungay (literally 'antler fern' or 'horn fern').

Distribution
Ceratopteris thalictroides is widespread across tropical regions.

Description
Rooted in mud, Ceratopteris thalictroides plants vary in size and appearance.

Proliferous or dormant buds with their overlapping dark scales present in the axils of fertile pinnae are winged. Pinnae are deeply incised with segments 2-15 mm x 10-30 mm and the fertile segments 1-2 mm x 10-80 mm.

In the north type and the third type, the count of chromosomes is 2n=126 while in the south type its 2n=154, making it separate from species.

Ecology
Ceratopteris thalictroides is often found near stagnant water or in still pockets along slow flowing rivers in swampy areas, swamp forests, sago swamps, marshes, natural and man-made ponds. Ceratopteris t. is often massed on or around logs or other floating vegetation. The plant was once recorded in a fresh-water mangrove (Sonneratia) growing among the finger-like pneumatophores. In some areas, Ceratopteris exhibits a degree of seasonality, reaching maturity and shedding spores during the dry season; plants have lost nearly all sterile fronds by this stage. The species has been reported to functionally be an annual, repopulating from spores the next season, but it is clearly of indefinite lifespan in cultivation.

Uses

Culinary
Fronds are cooked and eaten as a vegetable in Madagascar, New Guinea, and Vietnam, and raw as a salad in Micronesia..  It has been used similarly to watercress. In Malaysia and Japan, uncurled fronds have been used in salads. However, the plant is believed to contain carcinogenic chemicals.

Other
Ceratopteris t. is widely used as an aquarium plant, and is prized for its versatility, being used both as a floating plant and a plant that can be rooted in the substrate.

The plant can be used as manure for rice.

Ceratopteris t. is used medicinally as a poultice for dermatological issues in Malaysia and the Philippines. In China, it's applied to wounds to stop bleeding. 

In the Sepik region of New Guinea, fronds are used as a personal decoration.

Cultivation

It grows best in soil with a pH reading of 5-9 and in very high amounts of light. It usually grows quickly.

Ceratopteris t. can benefit (like all aquatic plants) from the addition of CO2. The plant's reproductive technique is similar to other ferns. Small adventitious plantlets are grown on the mother plant and are then released when ready.

It can provide useful shade to shyer fish and small fry. The dense roots are said to take nutrients out of the water, helping to prevent the growth of algae.

See also
Diplazium esculentum

References

External links
PROTAbase on Ceratopteris thalictroides
Flora of North America: Ceratopteris thalictroides
Nonindigenous Aquatic Plants: Ceratopteris thalictroides at UF/IFAS Center for Aquatic and Invasive Plants 
Australian National Herbarium
Tropica
How to Grow and Decorate with Watersprite

Pteridaceae
Flora of Asia
Flora of Australia
Aquatic plants
Flora of New South Wales
Flora of Queensland
Flora of Western Australia
Flora of the Northern Territory
Taxa named by Adolphe-Théodore Brongniart
Taxa named by Carl Linnaeus
Plants described in 1753